Caladenia marginata, commonly known as the white fairy orchid, is a species of orchid endemic to the south-west of Western Australia. It has a single pale green, hairy leaf and up to four creamy-white flowers and often grows in dense colonies, flowering profusely after summer fires.

Description 
Caladenia marginata is a terrestrial, perennial, deciduous, herb with an underground tuber and which often grows in dense colonies. The back surface of the sepals and petal is a rusty-brown colour. Flowering occurs from late September to November, most prolifically after fire the previous summer.

Although superficially similar to the white or pink forms of pink fairies (C. latifolia), C. marginata flowers later and has smaller flowers with brown hairs on the back.

Taxonomy and naming 
Caladenia marginata was first described in 1840 by John Lindley and the description was published in A Sketch of the Vegetation of the Swan River Colony. The specific epithet (marginata) is a Latin word  meaning "furnished with a border" referring to the thickened border of the sepals and petals.

Distribution and habitat 
White fairies occurs between Jurien Bay in the north-west and Israelite Bay in the south-east, growing in swamps and in shallow soil on granite outcrops in the Avon Wheatbelt, Esperance Plains, Jarrah Forest, Mallee, Swan Coastal Plain and Warren biogeographic regions.

Conservation
Caladenia marginata is classified as "Not Threatened" by the Western Australian Government Department of Parks and Wildlife.

References 

marginata
Endemic orchids of Australia
Orchids of Western Australia
Plants described in 1840